Menegazzia inactiva is a species of foliose lichen found in New Zealand and Australia. The type locality of this species is in Tasmania, south of Arthur River near Sumac Road. The species was discovered on Tasmannia lanceolata in rainforest habitat. The type specimen is held at the herbarium of the Tasmanian Museum and Art Gallery.

Conservation status
In November 2018 the New Zealand Department of Conservation classified M. inactiva as "Nationally Critical" with the qualifiers "Data Poor" and "Threatened Overseas" under the New Zealand Threat Classification System.

References

inactiva
Lichen species
Lichens of New Zealand
Lichens of Australia
Lichens described in 1987
Taxa named by Gintaras Kantvilas
Taxa named by Peter Wilfred James